Lempster is a town in Sullivan County, New Hampshire, United States. The population was 1,118 at the 2020 census. Settlements include the town center (Lempster village) and the village of East Lempster.

History 
First granted by colonial governor Jonathan Belcher in 1735 as "Number 9" (ninth in a line of forts to guard against Indian attacks), it was regranted in 1753 as "Dupplin", after Scottish lord Thomas Hay, Viscount Dupplin, by Governor Benning Wentworth. The town was re-granted one final time in 1767 as Lempster, after Sir Thomas Fermor, Second Baron Leominster or "Lempster", and incorporated in 1772.

Geography 
Lempster lies entirely within the Connecticut River watershed. The north part of town is drained by Giles Brook, which flows north to the South Branch of the Sugar River, reaching the Connecticut River at Claremont. The west side of town is drained by the Cold River and its tributary, Dodge Brook, reaching the Connecticut in Walpole. The southeast part of town is drained by the Ashuelot River, which flows southwest and reaches the Connecticut River at Hinsdale.

New Hampshire Route 10 traverses the town, connecting it with Goshen and Newport to the north and with Marlow, Gilsum, and Keene to the south. The village of East Lempster is located at the intersection of Route 10 and Second New Hampshire Turnpike. The village of Lempster proper is located along Second New Hampshire Turnpike,  to the west.

This town is home to large boulders that were likely moved by glaciers, such as these:

Adjacent municipalities
 Unity, New Hampshire (north)
 Goshen, New Hampshire (northeast)
 Washington, New Hampshire (east)
 Marlow, New Hampshire (south)
 Acworth, New Hampshire (west)

Demographics 

As of the census of 2000, there were 971 people, 387 households, and 275 families residing in the town.  The 2003 census estimate for the town was 1,044 residents. The population density was 30.0 people per square mile (11.6/km2).  There were 577 housing units at an average density of 17.8 per square mile (6.9/km2).  The racial makeup of the town was 97.22% White, 0.10% Native American, 0.10% Asian, 0.10% Pacific Islander, and 2.47% from two or more races. Hispanic or Latino of any race were 0.21% of the population.

There were 387 households, out of which 30.5% had children under the age of 18 living with them, 59.9% were married couples living together, 7.2% had a female householder with no husband present, and 28.7% were non-families. 22.0% of all households were made up of individuals, and 9.6% had someone living alone who was 65 years of age or older.  The average household size was 2.51 and the average family size was 2.90.

In the town, the population was spread out, with 24.3% under the age of 18, 5.3% from 18 to 24, 28.4% from 25 to 44, 27.9% from 45 to 64, and 14.1% who were 65 years of age or older.  The median age was 41 years. For every 100 females, there were 103.6 males.  For every 100 females age 18 and over, there were 105.9 males.

The median income for a household in the town was $40,458, and the median income for a family was $45,385. Males had a median income of $31,484 versus $22,566 for females. The per capita income for the town was $19,172.  About 3.2% of families and 7.3% of the population were below the poverty line, including 8.0% of those under age 18 and 5.3% of those age 65 or over.

Lempster wind farm 
Lempster is home to New Hampshire's first wind farm, providing a total of 24 MW from 12 turbines, which started operation in 2008. The turbines are located on Bean Mountain, a knob on the north-south ridge of Lempster Mountain.

Notable people
Martha Ann Honeywell (1786–1856), artist
Martin L. Keyes (1850–?), founder of Keyes Fibre Company (1903)
Hosea Washington Parker (1833–1922), lawyer, congressman
Mary Elizabeth Perley (1863–?), 19th- and 20th-century educator, author

References

External links 
 
 New Hampshire Economic and Labor Market Information Bureau Profile

 
Towns in Sullivan County, New Hampshire
Populated places established in 1772
Towns in New Hampshire
1772 establishments in New Hampshire